Caterina Balivo (born  21 February 1980) is an Italian television presenter and model.

Life and career 
Born in Naples, Balivo grew up in Aversa, Province of Caserta. In 1999 she entered the main competition at Miss Italia and she eventually ranked third.  Since 2000 she works with RAI as a television presenter.  In 2003 she debuted as an actress, and she also appeared in fotoromanzi.  Since 2012 Balivo is a freelance journalist.

Personal life
In 2012 Balivo  gave birth to her first child, a son, she had from  the financial manager Guido Maria Brera. The couple were married on August 30, 2014, in a civil ceremony in Capri.

Television

References

External links 
 
 

1980 births
Living people
Actresses from Naples
Italian television presenters
Italian stage actresses
People from Aversa
21st-century Italian actresses
Italian women television presenters